"Get Naked" is a song by American musician Tommy Lee's first solo project Methods of Mayhem, from their album Methods of Mayhem. It features vocals by Fred Durst, Lil' Kim and George Clinton, with turntablism contributed by Beastie Boys associate Mix Master Mike.

The U.S. and Australian singles (released in CD and vinyl formats) contain the clean and album versions of the song, along with a b-side ("Narcotic") and media documenting the making of the video.

The song contains explicit sexual content, with references to "cum", a "blow-job", a "porno tape", and male and female sex organs. The lyrics also deal with human penis size: Lil' Kim labels males with penises "under seven inches" as "mini-men" who are unsuitable for sex. It also had references to the leaked sex tape of Lee and then-wife Pamela Anderson which occurred 4 years prior to the songs release.

A sound clip from an early 1970s reggae piece by Charlie Ace and Fay called Punnany can be heard in the song. It also samples the song Magic Mountain by Eric Burdon and War.

Track listing

Australian CD single
"Get Naked" [Clean]
"Get Naked" (featuring Fred Durst, Lil' Kim, George Clinton and Mixmaster Mike)
"Narcotic"
"Making of Mayhem"

Charts

References

2000 debut singles
1999 songs
MCA Records singles
Songs written by Tommy Lee
Songs written by George Clinton (funk musician)
Songs written by Fred Durst
Songs written by Lil' Kim
Songs written by Garry Shider
Methods of Mayhem songs